During the 1999–2000 English football season, Everton competed in the Premier League, the FA Cup, and the Football League Cup.

Season summary
1999–2000 brought a one-place improvement upon the previous season's 14th-place finish for Everton. The season largely proved to be one of mid-table safety, with relegation never a serious threat, and a run to the quarter-finals of the FA Cup representing their best performance in the competition since they last won it in 1995, but the blue half of Merseyside was still left frustrated by their side's lack of success, something which had been a familiar scene for far too long. Manager Walter Smith, determined to address the inconsistency that had prevented Everton from doing better this season, pulled off one of the biggest transfer surprises of the close season by bringing in Paul Gascoigne and bolstering one of the most ungainly squads currently in the Premiership.

Off the pitch, the big story was the battle for control of the club's boardroom, with former chairman Peter Johnson finally being forced to sell his controlling interest after the Football Association threatened both Everton and Tranmere Rovers with sanctions unless he sold his shares in one of the clubs. On the eve of the new millennium, Johnson sold his shares in Everton to theatre impresario Bill Kenwright.

Final league table

Results summary

Results by round

Results
Everton's score comes first

Legend

FA Premier League

FA Cup

League Cup

Squad

Left club during season

Reserve squad

Transfers

In

Out

Transfers in:  £8,300,000
Transfers out:  £17,155,000
Total spending:  £8,855,000

Statistics

Starting 11
Considering starts in all competitions
 GK: #13,  Paul Gerrard, 37
 RB: #14,  David Weir, 42
 CB: #4,  Richard Gough, 32
 CB: #15,  Richard Dunne, 32
 LB: #6,  David Unsworth, 38
 RM: #8,  Nick Barmby, 42
 CM: #10,  Don Hutchison, 34
 CM: #7,  John Collins, 38
 LM: #12,  Mark Pembridge, 34
 CF: #9,  Kevin Campbell, 31
 CF: #17,  Francis Jeffers, 20

References

Everton F.C. seasons
Everton